Ayub Market, also known as F-8 Markaz is a commercial center located in Sector F-8, Islamabad. The market is mainly occupied by District courts, government offices of the Islamabad Capital Territory Administration and Margalla police station. There is also a foreigners registration center in the market.

References 

Commercial centres in Islamabad